The Church of Our Lady of Mount Carmel, more often colloquially referred to as Xizhimen Church, is a Roman Catholic Church located on the southern side at No. 130 of Xizhimen Neidajie in Beijing. It is commonly referred to as Xitang (the West Church) to the locals.

The church at Xizhimen was the last among the four historic Catholic churches in Beijing. The West Church was first built in 1723 during the Qing dynasty by the Italian Lazarist missionary Teodorico Pedrini: it was the first non-Jesuit church in Beijing.

After Pedrini's death the church was run by Carmelites and then Augustinians, who were there when it was destroyed in 1811. The church was rebuilt in 1867. After a second destruction in 1900 during the Boxer Rebellion, it was built again in 1912 as we can see it today.

Delicate Corinth pillars and Gothic peaked arches inside the church create a grand, elegant and solemn impression upon visitors.

There is red graffiti written on the church from the time of the Cultural Revolution, which the church deliberately retained.

Mass is conducted in French every Sunday at 11 a.m.

Stone inscription

 　　改建聖母聖衣堂碑記
 　竊維聖教永存蒼生洪濟數千年軼
　廢軼興誠大主之仁慈靈佑在焉遣
　使會司鐸德理格於一千七百二十
　三年獨輸巨資購置斯基恭建
聖母七苦堂一座一千八百一十一年
　適清嘉慶間聖教蒙難全堂被毀迨
　至一千八百六十七年主教孟慕理
　重為構築宏工鉅製規模一新詎意
　一千九百年六月十五日遭拳匪之
　禍本堂金司鐸遇害臺宇院落一炬
　無遺一千九百十二年仁愛會脩女
　博郎西耶氏復捐資新剏更易今名
　落成之日北京林主教飭勒石以誌
　顛末云爾
　西曆一千九百十三年二月　勒石

 

 TEODORICUS PEDRINI. PRESB. CONGR. MISS., INFAN-
 TIUM IMPERATORIS KANGHSI PRÆCEPTOR, AN. DOM. 1723
 HUNC FUNDUM PROPRIO ÆRE EMIT, IN EOQUE ECCLESIAM
 SUB AUSPICIIS SEPTEM DOLORUM B.M.V. DEO DEDICAVIT,
 QUÆ TEMPORE PERSECUTIONIS KIATSING (1811) FUNDI-
 TUS EST DESTRUCTA.

 POSTEA A.D. 1867, ILL. DD. MOULY, C.M., HIC NOVUM SA-
 CRUM ÆDIFICAVIT. QUOD DIE 15 JUNII 1900 BOXORES
 FLAMMIS TRADIDERUNT, DUM PAROCHUM ECCLESIÆ
 MAURITIUM DORE, C.M. SACERDOTEM CRUDELITER
 TRUCIDANT.

 TANDEM, ANNO DOMINI 1912 LARGITATE BENEMERITÆ
 ROSALIÆ BRANSSIER, SOCIETATIS PUELLARUM CA-
 RITATIS, TERTIA HÆC ECCLESIA SUB TITULO B.M. DE
 MONTE CARMELO ÆDIFICATA EST.
 IN QUORUM MEMORIAM ILL. DD. JARLIN, C.M., VIC. AP.
 PEKINESIS, HUNC LAPIDEM EREXIT.

References

See also

Wangfujing Cathedral (Dongtang)
Cathedral of the Immaculate Conception (Nantang)
Xishiku Cathedral (Beitang)

French diaspora in Asia
Roman Catholic churches in Beijing